USA-175, also known as GPS IIR-10 and GPS SVN-47, is an American navigation satellite which forms part of the Global Positioning System. It was the tenth Block IIR GPS satellite to be launched, out of thirteen in the original configuration, and twenty one overall. It was built by Lockheed Martin, using the AS-4000 satellite bus.

USA-175 was launched at 08:05:00 UTC on 21 December 2003, atop a Delta II carrier rocket, flight number D302, flying in the 7925-9.5 configuration. The launch took place from Space Launch Complex 17A at the Cape Canaveral Air Force Station, and placed USA-175 into a transfer orbit. The satellite raised itself into medium Earth orbit using a Star-48 apogee motor.

It is used to broadcast the PRN 22 signal, and operates in slot 2 of plane E of the GPS constellation. It was decommissioned in January of 2022, per the USCG Nanu 2022001.

References

Spacecraft launched in 2003
GPS satellites
USA satellites